Dong Neng-2 is an anti-satellite missile of the People's Liberation Army, developed in the early 2010s. It is designed as a low-earth orbit interceptor which destroys orbiting satellites by high speed kinetic impact.

See also
2007 Chinese anti-satellite missile test

References

Anti-satellite missiles
Anti-ballistic missiles of the People's Republic of China
Military equipment introduced in the 2010s